Charles Bastienne is a Seychellois politician who served as the Minister of Fisheries and Agriculture. He was appointed by President Danny Faure on 26 April 2018. He was previously the Minister of Interior in January 2015, succeeding Joel Morgan. On 3 November 2020, he was succeeded by Jean-François Ferrari for fisheries and Flavien Joubert for agriculture.

References 

Living people
Seychellois politicians 
Year of birth missing (living people)
Agriculture ministers of Seychelles
Fisheries ministers of Seychelles
Interior ministers of Seychelles